The Tongva Taraxat Paxaavxa Conservancy is an Indigenous urban land trust that formed with the objective to return or rematriate land to the Tongva people in the greater Los Angeles County area. It was inspired by the work of the Sogorea Te’ Land Trust and has been associated with the Land Back movement. The conservancy is notable for its part in the return of Tongva land in Los Angeles County for the first time in nearly 200 years. The trust developed a kuuyam nahwá’a or "guest exchange" program for people who live and work in the tribe's traditional homelands to financially support the land trust's goals.

Background 

The tribe experienced genocide and displacement from their lands since the arrival of settlers in the Los Angeles Basin area, which began with the Spanish mission period. Mission San Gabriel was constructed in 1771 and became the site of displaced peoples and violence.

In the American period, a state-sanctioned policy of elimination was enacted upon Indigenous peoples throughout the state known as the California genocide. Indigenous peoples concealed their identities among Mexican communities to keep their communities and cultures alive. In 1852, treaties that would have ensured about one-half of the current area of Los Angeles County for the tribe received hostility from settlers, who lobbied to prevent the treaties from being ratified.

Without federal recognition, the Tongva remained without a land base and have been effectively landless in their own traditional homelands for hundreds of years.

Formation 

The formation of the Tongva Taraxat Paxaavxa Conservancy is part of an effort to return land throughout the traditional homelands of the Tongva to the tribe. It was founded as a nonprofit organization.

The objectives of the conservancy are to steward and heal the lands by returning native plants to areas that have been overrun by invasive species, to protect the theft and destruction of wild white sage plants, and to build community toward supporting tribal members and cultural practices. The trust has also developed a kuuyam nahwá’a or "guest exchange" program for people who live and work in the tribe's traditional homelands to support the land trust's goals.

History 
The first land return to the conservancy occurred in October 2022, after a private resident returned a 1-acre property in Altadena, California to the conservancy. Although a small parcel of land, the return was notable for being the first time the tribe had land anywhere in Los Angeles County in nearly 200 years.

References 

Native American organizations
Land trusts in California